Jeenathan Williams Jr. (born February 12, 1999) is an American professional basketball player for the Salt Lake City Stars of the NBA G League. He played college basketball for the Buffalo Bulls of the Mid-American Conference (MAC).

High school career
Williams played basketball for University Prep Charter School for Young Men in Rochester, New York. As a junior, he averaged 22 points, seven rebounds and five assists per game and was named to the Class AA all-state fifth team. For his senior season, Williams transferred to Prolific Prep in Napa, California, where he averaged 15.8 points per game. He competed for the City Rocks on the Amateur Athletic Union circuit alongside Isaiah Stewart and Buddy Boeheim. A four-star recruit, Williams committed to playing college basketball for Buffalo over offers from Syracuse, Virginia, Pittsburgh, Temple and St. Bonaventure. He became the highest-rated recruit in program history.

College career
As a freshman at Buffalo, Williams averaged 3.2 points and 1.7 rebounds per game. In his sophomore season, he moved into the starting lineup, and averaged 11.6 points and 4.7 rebounds per game. Following the season, he worked on his ballhandling and shooting with coaches in Florida and California. On November 27, 2020, Williams posted a junior season-high 28 points and 12 rebounds in a 74–65 win against Towson. As a junior, he averaged 17.6 points, 6.8 rebounds and 2.4 assists per game, earning Second Team All-Mid-American Conference (MAC) honors. Williams declared for the 2021 NBA draft before withdrawing and returning to Buffalo. In his senior season debut on November 10, 2021, he scored a career-high 32 points and grabbed eight rebounds in an 88–76 loss to sixth-ranked Michigan. Williams was named to the First Team All-MAC.

Professional career

Salt Lake City Stars (2022–present)
On October 23, 2022, Williams joined the Salt Lake City Stars training camp roster.

Career statistics

College

|-
| style="text-align:left;"| 2018–19 
| style="text-align:left;"| Buffalo
| 36 || 0 || 9.1 || .358 || .106 || .611 || 1.7 || .2 || .2 || .2 || 3.2
|-
| style="text-align:left;"| 2019–20 
| style="text-align:left;"| Buffalo 
| 32 || 31 || 25.7 || .455 || .318 || .708 || 4.7 || 1.2 || .8 || .7 || 11.6
|-
| style="text-align:left;"| 2020–21
| style="text-align:left;"| Buffalo
| 25 || 24 || 30.8 || .486 || .386 || .708 || 6.8 || 2.4 || 1.1 || .4 || 17.6
|-
| style="text-align:left;"| 2021–22
| style="text-align:left;"| Buffalo
| 29 || 29 || 32.6 || .490 || .451 || .690 || 5.0 || 2.9 || 1.4 || .8 || 19.1
|- class="sortbottom"
| style="text-align:center;" colspan="2"| Career
| 122 || 84 || 23.5 || .467 || .355 || .688 || 4.3 || 1.6 || .8 || .5 || 12.1

References

External links
Buffalo Bulls bio

1999 births
Living people
American men's basketball players
Basketball players from New York (state)
Buffalo Bulls men's basketball players
Salt Lake City Stars players
Shooting guards
Small forwards
Sportspeople from Rochester, New York